Aloja is a town in Limbaži Municipality in the Vidzeme region of Latvia, close to the border with Estonia. Until 2009 it was within the former Limbaži District.

Aloja as a settlement was first mentioned in written sources in 1449. Aloja saw rapid development after Latvian agrarian reforms in 1920. In 1925 Aloja was granted a status of a village and it became also a centre of the parish. In 1936 new Rīga- Rūjiena railway line was constructed through Aloja.
In 1992 Aloja was granted town rights. From 2009 until 2021, Aloja was the administrative center of the former Aloja Municipality.

Notable residents
Pāvils Dreijmanis, architect
Lauris Dzelzītis, actor

Gallery

References

External links

 
Towns in Latvia
Populated places established in 1992
Limbaži Municipality
Kreis Wolmar
Vidzeme